Baisha Li Autonomous County (Chinese: s ), p Báishā Lízú Zìzhìxiàn) is one of 6 autonomous counties of Hainan, China.  In 1999 its population was 176,377 people, largely made up of the Li people.

Baisha County was established in 1935, alongside Baoting County and Ledong County. In 1958, this county was briefly merged into Dongfang County before reestablished three years later. On 20 November 1987, the State Council ratified this county as an autonomous county for Li people, and on 30 December the official establishment ceremony was held.

Administrative division
Baisha County is divided into:
 4 Towns (镇): Yacha (牙叉镇), Qifang (七坊镇), Bangxi (邦溪镇), Da'an (打安镇).
 7 Townships (乡)：Xishui Township (细水乡), Yuanmen Township (元门乡), Nankai Township (南开乡), Fulong Township (阜龙乡), Qingsong Township (青松乡), Jinpo Township (金波乡), Rongbang Township (荣邦乡).
 9 Township-level Farm Areas (农场)

Demography

The main spoken languages in this county are Hlai language, Hainanese, and Putonghua.

Geography
Baisha County are mostly mountainous forests which covered 83.47% of the county. The mountainous areas occupy around 73.1% of the county area, seconded by hilly areas with 19.1%, and the rest is plains with 7.7%. The highest mountain in the county is Yinggeling Mountain (1812 m above sea level), which also Hainan's second highest mountain after Wuzhi Mountain. The source of rivers like Nandu River, Changhua River, Zhubo River, and Shilu River, are found in this county.

Climate

Transportation

Railway
 Hainan western ring railway: Furongtian railway station (芙蓉田火车站)

Highway
 China National Highway 225
 Hainan Provincial Expressway: S310 & S315

Gallery

See also
 List of administrative divisions of Hainan

References

External links
 Official website (Chinese)

 
Baisha Li Autonomous County
Li autonomous counties